Bradley is a town in Grady County, Oklahoma, United States.  The population was 130 at the 2010 census.

Geography
Bradley is located at  (34.876233, -97.708848).

Demographics

At the 2000 census there were 182 people, 67 households, and 52 families living in the town. The racial makeup of the town was 90.11% White, 4.40% Native American, 0.55% Asian, and 4.95% from two or more races. Hispanic or Latino of any race were 1.10%.

Of the 67 households 41.8% had children under the age of 18 living with them, 68.7% were married couples living together, 6.0% had a female householder with no husband present, and 20.9% were non-families. 19.4% of households were one person and 6.0% were one person aged 65 or older. The average household size was 2.72 and the average family size was 3.08.

The age distribution was 29.7% under the age of 18, 6.6% from 18 to 24, 35.2% from 25 to 44, 22.0% from 45 to 64, and 6.6% 65 or older. The median age was 33 years. For every 100 females, there were 106.8 males. For every 100 females age 18 and over, there were 100.0 males.

The median household income was $21,429 and the median family income  was $20,938. Males had a median income of $17,250 versus $13,333 for females. The per capita income for the town was $9,165. About 22.0% of families and 26.7% of the population were below the poverty line, including 27.3% of those under the age of 18 and 64.7% of those 65 or over.

References

External links
 Encyclopedia of Oklahoma History and Culture - Bradley

Towns in Grady County, Oklahoma
Towns in Oklahoma